Socoltenango is a town and one of the 119 Municipalities of Chiapas, in southern Mexico.

As of 2010, the municipality had a total population of 17,125, up from 15,171 as of 2005. It covers an area of 775 km².

As of 2010, the town of Socoltenango had a population of 4,863. Other than the town of Socoltenango, the municipality had 125 localities, the largest of which (with 2010 populations in parentheses) was: Tzinil (1,106), classified as rural.

References

Municipalities of Chiapas